Joravasan railway station is a small railway station on the Western Railway network in the state of Gujarat, India. Joravasan railway station is 14 km away from Valsad railway station. Passenger and MEMU trains halt here.

References

See also
 Navsari district

Railway stations in Navsari district
Mumbai WR railway division